Tatuyo is a tonal Tucanoan language of Colombia. Lexically, its closest relative is Carapano: the two languages' lexicons are 96.3% cognates.

Phonology 
Tatuyo has 6 vowels: /a, e, i, ɨ, o, u/.

References

Languages of Colombia
Tucanoan languages